is an island located within Guanabara Bay in the city and state of Rio de Janeiro, Brazil. It is east of the neighborhood Guanabara. It is home to the Arsenal de Marinha do Rio de Janeiro base of the Brazilian Navy.

See also
 List of islands of Brazil

References

Atlantic islands of Brazil
Guanabara Bay
Geography of Rio de Janeiro (city)
Landforms of Rio de Janeiro (state)